The Philosophy of Velocity is a 2006 concept album by the rock band Brazil.  Many of the songs on the album are lyrical short stories and vignettes, focusing on themes of isolation, paranoia, anxiety, and the supernatural with an emphasis on absurdity, dark humor, and camp.

Reception

The Philosophy of Velocity has been met with critical acclaim from many national print and online publications.  Allmusic called it “a natural extension of all that has come before, yet a giant step forward for the band.” Alternative Press says “even name-dropping…their peers can’t contain or adequately describe what they have crafted for their follow-up to 2004’s A Hostage and the Meaning of Life.”

Track listing
"On Safe-Cracking and Rubella" - 1:16
"Crime (and the Antique Solution)" - 3:15
"You Never Know" - 3:49
"The Vapours" - 2:50
"Cameo" - 3:21
"Candles (Cast Long Shadows)" - 5:09
"Au, Revoir, Mr. Mercury" - 6:20
"Captain Mainwaring" - 5:50
"A Year In Heaven" - 5:12
"The Remarkable Cholmondley Chute System" - 0:49
"Breathe" - 3:47
"Strange Days" - 6:29

Credits
Jonathon Newby – vocals, keyboards, timpani, chimes, glockenspiel, tambourine
Nic Newby – keyboards
Aaron Smith – electric guitar, engineering
Eric Johnson – electric guitar, acoustic guitar, classical guitar, 12-string guitar
James Sefchek – drums, timpani, chimes
Philip Williams – bass

With

Dave Fridmann – co-producer, engineer
Greg Calbi - mastering
Matt Miller – pre-production
Brand Smith – pre-production

References

External links

Official sites
Brazil's Web Site
Brazil's Myspace
Brazil's Purevolume

Brazil (band) albums
2006 albums
Albums with cover art by Sons of Nero
Albums recorded at Tarbox Road Studios